Aanchal Sharma is a Nepalese film actress, model and VJ from Nepal. She made her acting debut in Nepali Cinema from the film Nai Nabhannu La 4, which is directed by Bikash Raj Acharya.

Career
She made her acting debut in Nepali cinema with a film directed by Bikash Raj Acharya Nai Nabhannu La 4. In 2018, she appeared in Shatru Gate and Johny Gentleman.

Filmography

References

External links

 

Nepalese female models
Living people
Actors from Kathmandu
1995 births
Nepalese film actresses
Actresses in Nepali cinema
Actresses in Telugu cinema
Nepalese expatriate actresses in India
21st-century Nepalese dancers
21st-century Nepalese actresses